HMS Sturgeon was an  of the British Royal Navy. Sturgeon was built built by Alexander Stephen and Sons in Glasgow, Scotland, and was launched on 11 January 1917 and completed in February that year. The ship took its name after Sturgeon, a freshwater fish.

Sturgeon served in the North Sea as part of the Harwich Force during the remainder of the First World War. After the end of the war, the destroyer was used as a tender to the Britannia Royal Naval College at Dartmouth, Devon. Sturgeon was sold for scrap on 16 December 1926.

Design
The R-class was a further development of the M-class destroyer, which had been the last class of destroyers ordered for the Royal Navy before the start of the First World War, and had therefore been built in large numbers during the early years of the war.  The R-class differed by having geared rather than direct drive steam turbines, giving greater fuel efficiency, having a higher forecastle for better seakeeping and a larger and more robust bridge structure.

Three Yarrow water-tube boilers fed steam to Brown-Curtis geared steam turbines which drove two propeller shafts.
The ships were armed with three 4-inch (102 mm) QF Mk IV guns, together with one 2-pounder pom-pom anti-aircraft autocannon. Two twin 21-inch (533mm torpedo tubes were fitted. The ships had a crew of 82.

History
Sturgeon was ordered in July 1915 as part of the sixth Emergency War Programme, one of 19 R-class destroyers ordered under that Programme. The destroyer was laid down at Alexander Stephen and Sons' Govan, Glasgow shipyard as Yard number 477 on 10 November 1915, ''Sturgeon was launched on 11 January 1917, the second ship of that name to be built for the Royal Navy, and was completed on 26 February 1917. 

During the First World War, the ship was assigned to the 10th Destroyer Flotilla, as part of the Harwich Force, which operated in the North Sea and could reinforce the Grand Fleet or forces in the English Channel as required. In June 1917, an explosion occurred on the ship that resulted in the death of a Petty Officer. The future physicist Patrick Blackett served on the ship during the war. On 11 March 1918, the ship together with the destroyers , and  spotted the conning tower of a German submarine in the southern North Sea, and attacked with depth charges. The submarine broke surface at a high angle and was depth charged again, bringing up oil and wreckage, including a wooden ladder, a life buoy and a calcium flare.

Sturgeon remained part of the Harwich Force at the end of the war on 11 November 1918, but by February 1919, was based at Devonport and attached to the Royal Navy College at Dartmouth, Devon. On 18 October 1921, Sturgeon stood by the laid up steamer Manchurian Prince in Dartmouth harbour when the steamer suffered an engine room fire. In 1926, Sturgeon was replaced as tender to Dartmouth College by the minesweeper .

She was sold for breaking up on 16 December 1926 to Plymouth & Devon Ship Breaking Company of Plymouth.

The ship's official badge is in the collections of the Imperial War Museum.

Pennant numbers

References

World War I destroyers of the United Kingdom
1917 ships
R-class destroyers (1916)